The 2019 Desert Diamond Casino West Valley 200 is a NASCAR Xfinity Series race held on November 9, 2019, at ISM Raceway in Avondale, Arizona. Contested over 200 laps on the  oval, it was the 32nd race of the 2019 NASCAR Xfinity Series season, sixth race of the Playoffs, and the final race of the Round of 8.

Background

Track

ISM Raceway is a 1-mile, low-banked tri-oval race track located in Avondale, Arizona, near Phoenix. The motorsport track opened in 1964 and currently hosts two NASCAR race weekends annually. ISM Raceway has also hosted the CART, IndyCar Series, USAC and the WeatherTech SportsCar Championship. The raceway is currently owned and operated by International Speedway Corporation.

Entry list

Practice

First practice

Final practice

Qualifying

Qualifying results

. – Playoffs driver

Race

Summary
Christopher Bell started on pole and led for the first 48 laps. The first caution occurred when Michael Annett and Riley Herbst tangled. Bell lost the lead to Tyler Reddick for one lap, but quickly took it back and won Stage 1. Bell and Austin Cindric were tagged for speeding on pit road. Cole Custer and Justin Allgaier exchanged the lead afterwards. Bell also won Stage 2 after briefly taking the lead.

Bell lost his chance of winning the race after a spin on lap 117 caused him to go one lap down. However, Bell was already locked into the finale from his win at the previous week's race. Chase Briscoe took the lead on the restart, but lost it to Allgaier as Briscoe only took fuel on the last caution (he had hoped for another caution to occur). Allgaier held onto the lead, holding off a charging Custer to take the victory and advance to the final 4.

Reddick and Custer also made the championship 4 on points, eliminating Cindric, Briscoe, Annett, and Noah Gragson.

Stage Results

Stage One
Laps: 60

Stage Two
Laps: 60

Final Stage Results

Stage Three
Laps: 80

. – Driver advanced to the Championship 4.

. – Driver was eliminated from the playoffs.

References

2019 in sports in Arizona
NASCAR races at Phoenix Raceway
Desert Diamond Casino West Valley 200
2019 NASCAR Xfinity Series